The Provisional National Assembly, unofficially also referred to as the Vienna National Assembly, was the first parliament of the Republic of German-Austria. It functioned during and after the collapse of the Austro-Hungarian Empire from 21 October 1918 to 16 February 1919. The last meeting took place on 6 February 1919 when the Geschäftsordnung for the Constituent Assembly was adopted. The assembly was composed of the members of the Chamber of Deputies of the former Imperial Council, who had represented the German-speaking areas of the Austrian half of the dual monarchy. It therefore also involved delegates whose territories were not allowed to join German-Austria because of the Treaty of St. Germain. The 208 deputies were all men; in the elections of 1911 women had not been eligible to vote yet.

References 

Government of Austria
Austrian Parliament
Politics of Austria